Harry Lee (June 4, 1872 – May 13, 1935) was a decorated major general in the United States Marine Corps and a military governor of Santo Domingo.

Early life and education
Harry Lee was born in Washington, D.C., on 4 June 1872.

Career
Lee was appointed as a second lieutenant in the U.S. Marine Corps for the Spanish–American War on 2 August 1898. He served at the Havana Naval Station during the war, and following it, aboard various ships of the United States Navy and many Marine Corps stations.

Lee took command of the 6th Marine Regiment in June 1918, a year after the American entry into World War I, in succession to Albertus W. Catlin, who had been badly wounded. He led the unit through the battles at Château-Thierry, St. Mihiel, and the Meuse-Argonne Offensive, marching with the Army to the Rhine.

After the war, he commanded the Marine brigade in Santo Domingo, sent in 1921 to pacify the Dominican Republic and establish constitutional government. For 3 years, he served as military governor of the country.

Later, Lee commanded Marine Barracks, Parris Island. On 1 March 1933, he assumed command of the Marine Corps Base Quantico.

Later life and death
Lee died on May 13, 1935, at age 62, at the Quantico Marine Base.

Awards and decorations
For World War I service, Lee was awarded the Silver Star, Navy and also Army versions of the Distinguished Service Medal, the French Legion of Honor, and other decorations.

Legacy
 was named after Lee.
Harry Lee Hall on Marine Corps Base Quantico is named for MajGen Lee. Harry Lee Hall initially served as the Officer's Club, it is currently the home to the promotions branch of Headquarters Marine Corps.

See also

References

Harry Lee – DANFS Online.

1872 births
1935 deaths
People from Washington, D.C.
American military personnel of the Spanish–American War
United States Marine Corps personnel of World War I
United States Marine Corps generals
Recipients of the Navy Distinguished Service Medal
Recipients of the Distinguished Service Medal (US Army)
Recipients of the Silver Star
Recipients of the Legion of Honour
Military personnel from Washington, D.C.